Atypophthalmus is a genus of crane fly in the family Limoniidae.

Species
Subgenus Atypophthalmus Brunetti, 1911
A. andringitrae (Alexander, 1965)
A. barthelemyi (Alexander, 1923)
A. bilobatus (Alexander, 1955)
A. bobyensis (Alexander, 1965)
A. bourbonensis (Alexander, 1957)
A. comoricola (Alexander, 1979)
A. crinitus (Alexander, 1924)
A. densifimbriatus (Alexander, 1955)
A. emaceratus (Alexander, 1921)
A. flavopyga (Alexander, 1921)
A. fuscopleura (Alexander, 1920)
A. gausapa (Alexander, 1972)
A. gurneyanus (Alexander, 1972)
A. hovamendicus (Alexander, 1955)
A. infixus (Walker, 1865)
A. inusitatellus (Alexander, 1964)
A. inustus (Meigen, 1818)
A. kurma (Alexander, 1966)
A. languidus (Alexander, 1934)
A. mahensis (Edwards, 1912)
A. marleyi (Alexander, 1917)
A. mauritianus (Alexander, 1956)
A. mendicus (Alexander, 1921)
A. mjobergi (Edwards, 1926)
A. multisetosus Savchenko, 1983
A. parvapiculatus (Alexander, 1973)
A. patritus (Alexander, 1956)
A. patulus (Alexander, 1932)
A. pendleburyi (Edwards, 1928)
A. perreductus (Alexander, 1941)
A. polypogon (Alexander, 1970)
A. prodigiosus (Alexander, 1979)
A. quinquevittatus (Santos Abreu, 1923)
A. sedatus (Alexander, 1922)
A. segnis (Alexander, 1955)
A. seychellanus (Alexander, 1956)
A. stylacanthus (Alexander, 1971)
A. submendicus (Alexander, 1921)
A. tamborinus (Alexander, 1930)
A. taoensis (Hynes, 1993)
A. thaumastopyga (Alexander, 1961)
A. thomasseti (Edwards, 1912)
A. umbratus (de Meijere, 1911)
A. vinsoni (Alexander, 1954)
Subgenus Microlimonia Savchenko, 1976
A. bicorniger (Alexander, 1932)
A. egressus (Alexander, 1938)
A. inelegans (Alexander, 1924)
A. machidai (Alexander, 1921)
A. omogoensis (Alexander, 1954)

References

Limoniidae
Nematocera genera
Taxa named by Enrico Adelelmo Brunetti